Stuart David Robertson (born 1 May 1947) is a former Zimbabwean first class cricketer. He played for what was then Rhodesia during the 1970s. In 1972 he was one of the South African Cricket Annual Cricketers of the Year.

References

1947 births
Living people
Cricketers from Harare
Zimbabwean people of British descent
White Rhodesian people
Zimbabwean cricketers
Rhodesia cricketers